Loxocalyx is a genus of plants in the family Lamiaceae, first described in 1891. It is native to China and Japan.

Species
 Loxocalyx ambiguus (Makino) Makino - Japan
 Loxocalyx quinquenervius Hand.-Mazz. - Hunan
 Loxocalyx urticifolius Hemsl. - Gansu, Guizhou, Hebei, Henan, Hubei, Shaanxi, Sichuan, Yunnan

References

Lamiaceae
Lamiaceae genera